Garnt Maneetapho (born 31 May 1990), better known as Gigguk, is a Thai-British YouTuber and podcaster who is known for his comedic rants and reviews on anime and otaku culture. He is affiliated with the Kadokawa-backed agency GeeXPlus.

Career 
He used the online pseudonym "Gigguk," a combination of his family nickname "Gigg" and UK, his place of residence, and called his channel The Anime Zone. In 2012, he was a producer in abridging popular anime, starting with Evangelion into the EvAbridged series.

During 2017, Maneetapho retired the Anime Zone moniker for his channel, using just Gigguk. In February 2018, Maneetapho presented the Best Comedy award at the 2nd Crunchyroll Anime Awards, alongside YouTuber LilyPichu, at the Ricardo Montalbán Theatre in Los Angeles.

In November 2019, Maneetapho, along with YouTuber Sydney Poniewaz (Sydsnap), moved to northwestern Tokyo, Japan to begin working as an influencer for GeeXPlus. The effort was to help promote/introduce anime and Japanese culture to the rest of the world through his content.

In February 2020, Maneetapho joined alongside Connor Colquhoun (CDawgVA) and Joey Bizinger (The Anime Man) in creating and hosting a weekly audio and video podcast called Trash Taste, where they discuss anime, manga, otaku culture, and their experiences while living in Japan. The first episode was released on 5 June 2020 with new episodes available on YouTube and major podcast platforms every Friday. In August 2020 Maneetapho participated in a chess tournament hosted by Chess.com for anime YouTubers. Reaching the finals, Maneetapho beat fellow Trash Taste co-host Connor Colquhoun. In July 2021, Maneetapho successfully defended his title in Tournament Arc 2, hosted again by Chess.com.

Personal life 
Maneetapho's parents are from Thailand, and he was born and raised in the United Kingdom. He is a practicing Buddhist, and has served as a monk twice in his life, once when he was a  teenager and once as an adult. Maneetapho became engaged to fellow YouTuber Sydney Poniewaz on 12 April 2019. On 5 June 2022, they were married at a ceremony in the UK.

References

External links
 
 Gigguk on IMDb

Living people
Alumni of the University of Bristol
British expatriates in Japan
English video bloggers
English people of Thai descent
English YouTubers
People from Brighton
YouTube channels
Patreon creators
YouTube channels launched in 2006
British Buddhists
1990 births